Anne River may refer to:
 Anne River (New Zealand)
 Anne River (Tasmania)

See also
Ann Rivers (born 1968), American politician
Ann River, Minnesota